Anoectangium is a genus of mosses belonging to the family Pottiaceae.

The genus has cosmopolitan distribution.

Species:
 Anoectangium abyssinicum Hampe ex Geheeb, 1899 
 Anoectangium aestivum Mitten, 1869

References

Pottiaceae
Moss genera